La Póveda de Soria is a municipality located in the province of Soria, Castile and León, Spain. According to the latest 2019 data from the Spanish National Institute of Statistics (INE), the municipality has a population of 123 inhabitants.

References

Municipalities in the Province of Soria